Megachile whiteana is a species of bee in the family Megachilidae. It was described by Cameron in 1905.

References

Whiteana
Insects described in 1905